Smashed may refer to:
 "Smashed" (Buffy the Vampire Slayer), a season six episode of Buffy the Vampire Slayer
 "Smashed" (Arrested Development), a season four episode of Arrested Development
 Smashed (film), a 2012 film directed by James Ponsoldt
 Smashed (memoir), a 2005 memoir by Koren Zailckas
 "Smashed", a song from the 2011 album The Black Crown by Suicide Silence

See also 
 Smash (disambiguation)